Kossowa  is a village in the administrative district of Gmina Brzeźnica, within Wadowice County, Lesser Poland Voivodeship, in southern Poland.

The village has a population of 420.

References

Kossowa